The Huxley Memorial Medal and Lecture is a lecture and associated medal that was created in 1900 by the Royal Anthropological Institute of Great Britain and Ireland to honour the anthropologist Thomas Henry Huxley. The lecture and medal are awarded annually to any scientist who distinguishes themselves in any field of anthropological research. Thomas Huxley was fortunate to have another memorial lecture named his honour, The Huxley Lecture that was instituted by the members of Charing Cross Hospital Medical School in 1896.

Huxley had been a member of both the Ethnological Society of London (ESL) and the Anthropological Society of London since 1863, and he was President of the ESL during its last two years, and Vice President of the Institute when John Lubbock, Lord Avebury was President. A Huxley Lecture Committee was convened in May 1896,  which decided that scientist should be invited to deliver a lecture to honour Huxley.

Recipients

References

British lecture series